Kathleen Wilson-Thompson is a business executive working in the manufacturing and health industries.

In the late-1970s Wilson-Thompson studied Literature in Ann Arbor, Michigan and in 1979 received an A.B. degree from the University of Michigan.  She then studied law at Wayne State University, gaining a J.D. degree in 1982.

She worked for Kellogg's.  Later in 1996 Wilson-Thompson received a master's degree in Corporate and Financial Law, also from Wayne State University.

In late-2009 Wilson-Thompson was appointed as a senior human resources executive at pharmaceutical company Walgreens Boots Alliance, with the position as Senior Vice President and Chief Human Resources Officer starting in January 2010.

As of late-December 2018, Wilson-Thompson was appointed to the board of Tesla, Inc. at the same time as Larry Ellison.  In 2019, Wilson-Thompson received $7.4 million in cash and stock for this role.

References

1950s births
Living people
Tesla, Inc. people
University of Michigan alumni